
Gmina Olszówka is a rural gmina (administrative district) in Koło County, Greater Poland Voivodeship, in west-central Poland.

Villages
Gmina Olszówka contains the villages and settlements of Adamin, Dębowiczki, Drzewce, Głębokie, Grabina, Krzewata, Łubianka, Młynik, Mniewo, Nowa Wioska, Olszówka, Ostrów, Ponętów Górny Drugi, Ponętów Górny Pierwszy, Przybyszew, Szczepanów, Tomaszew, Umień, Zawadka and Złota.

Neighbouring gminas
Gmina Olszówka is bordered by the gminas of Dąbie, Grabów, Grzegorzew and Kłodawa.

References
Polish official population figures 2006

Olszowka
Koło County